Joseph Marshall Flint (1872 – September 16, 1944) was an American college football player and coach and surgeon. He served as the head football coach at Butler University in Indianapolis, Indiana from 1894 to 1895 and at Stevens Point Normal School—now known as the University of Wisconsin–Stevens Point—in 1897, compiling a career college football coaching record of 10–4.

Flint receive his medical degree from Johns Hopkins University in 1900 and served as a surgeon in the United States Military during World War I. He was noted for his ability to bring assembly line style procedures to the medical process.

Head coaching record

References

1872 births
1944 deaths
19th-century players of American football
American football halfbacks
American surgeons
Butler Bulldogs football coaches
Princeton Tigers football players
Wisconsin–Stevens Point Pointers football coaches